Live at The Siren is a live album released by the Canadian hard rock band Harem Scarem. The album features two studio songs and was only released in Japan.

Track listing

Band members
Harry Hess – lead vocals, guitar, producer.
Pete Lesperance – lead guitar, backing vocals, producer.
Barry Donaghy – bass, backing vocals.
Darren Smith – drums, backing vocals.

1998 live albums
Harem Scarem albums
Warner Music Group live albums